Wangtuan is a town located at the east tip of Lixin County, northwestern Anhui province, East China, bordering Mengcheng County.

Bozhou
Towns in Anhui